Secrets and Words is a 2012 British drama television series shown on BBC One, produced by Jimmy McGovern's production company, LA Productions. Each episode is a story on the theme of adult literacy.  BBC Skillswise collaborated with the series, providing adult learners with an activity to participate with following each episode.

Production
The National Institute of Adult Continuing Education (NIACE) were involved in developing the series, highlighting challenges facing British who had literacy issues. It was filmed in Liverpool.

Episodes

References

External links 

2012 British television series debuts
2012 British television series endings
2010s British drama television series
2010s British television miniseries
BBC television dramas
BBC Daytime television series
English-language television shows
Television shows set in Liverpool